Askalu Mohammad Hasanlu (also Romanized as Askalū Moḩammad Ḩasanlū) is a village in Garamduz Rural District, Garamduz District, Khoda Afarin County, East Azerbaijan Province, Iran. At the 2006 census, its population was 214, in 32 families.

References 

Populated places in Khoda Afarin County